The Chevrolet Inline-4 engine was one of Chevrolet's first automobile engines, designed by Arthur Mason and introduced in 1913. Chevrolet founder Billy Durant, who previously had owned Buick which had pioneered the overhead valve engine, used the same basic engine design for Chevrolet: exposed pushrods and rocker arms which actuated valves in the detachable crossflow cylinder head. This was referred to this as a "valve-in-head" design, and it drew considerable publicity in a time when most rivals were flatheads. It was produced through 1928 when it was replaced by the Chevrolet Stovebolt engine.

Chevrolet would not use another four cylinder engine until 1961 and the introduction of the straight-6-derived Chevrolet 153 4-cylinder engine that was installed in the Chevy II. For other, more modern Chevrolet four-cylinder engines see the list of GM engines.

171
The  engine was the first and most common member of this family. It featured splash lubrication. Because of increased weight of the slightly longer 1928 Chevrolet National Series AB performance failed to improve from the 1927 Chevrolet Series AA Capitol.

Applications:
 1914–1916 Chevrolet Series H
 1916–1917 Chevrolet 490
 1917 Chevrolet Series F
 1918–1922 Chevrolet 490
 1923–1926 Chevrolet Superior
(includes 1923 Series B, 1924 Series F, 1925 Series K, and 1926 Series V)
 1927 Chevrolet Series AA Capitol
 1928 Chevrolet Series AB National

224
The  engine, the larger engine in this family, was introduced in 1917 for the 1918 model year and used only in the Series FA and FB.

Applications:
 1918 Chevrolet Series FA
 1919-1922 Chevrolet Series FB
 1921-1922 Oldsmobile Model 43A

See also
 Chevrolet Stovebolt engine
 List of GM engines

References

 

Straight-4